Steriphoma is a genus of flowering plant in family Capparaceae. It contains 11 species of which only 5 are accepted:
 Steriphoma ellipticum (DC.) Spreng.
 Steriphoma macranthum Standl.
 Steriphoma paradoxum 
 Steriphoma peruvianum 
 Steriphoma urbani Eggers

References

Capparaceae
Brassicales genera
Taxonomy articles created by Polbot